Cosmia restituta is a moth of the family Noctuidae. It is found in the Russian Far East, Korea, Japan, Nepal and Taiwan.

The length of the forewings is about 14 mm and the wingspan is 25–29 mm.

Subspecies
Cosmia restituta restituta
Cosmia restituta picta (Staudinger, 1888) (Siberia, Japan)

References

Moths described in 1857
Cosmia
Moths of Japan